Veydelevka is an urban locality (an urban-type settlement) and the administrative center of Veydelevsky District of Belgorod Oblast, Russia. Population:

References

Urban-type settlements in Belgorod Oblast
Populated places in Veydelevsky District
Wedel family